Portalarium, Inc. was a video game developer based in Austin, Texas that was formed in September 2009 by Richard Garriott, together with his longtime game industry partners, Dallas Snell and Fred Schmidt. Portalarium marks Richard Garriott's first return to the video game industry since the release of his 2007 title Tabula Rasa. The name "Portalarium," as well as the company's motto, "We take you there," are intended as a continuity and reference to Garriott's prior two companies' names and respective mottoes; Origin Systems, "We Create Worlds," and Destination Games, "We have arrived."

The company initially released Port Casino and later Ultimate Collector: Garage Sale in a partnership with Zynga but shut them down when the Facebook game market crashed.

Their next title, Shroud of the Avatar: Forsaken Virtues, is an MMORPG and spiritual successor to the Ultima series. Garriott has stated that if had he been able to secure the rights to the Ultima intellectual property from Electronic Arts, that the game could in fact literally have become Ultima Online 2 in name. Starr Long, who originally served as project director for Ultima Online at Origin, and represented the character of Lord Blackthorn in game, joined the Portalarium team to work as executive producer for Shroud of the Avatar.

In October 2019, the assets and rights to Shroud of the Avatar were sold to Catnip Games, a company owned by Portalarium CEO Chris Spears. Portalarium itself has been dormant since then, with no games in development or known assets. The company later had its right to transact business forfeited by the Texas Comptroller. As of September 2020, Portalarium appears to be defunct.

References

External links

Portalarium on Facebook
Shroud of the Avatar: Forsaken Virtues official website
Port Casino on Facebook

Companies based in Austin, Texas
Privately held companies based in Texas
Defunct video game companies of the United States
Video game development companies
Video game publishers
2009 establishments in Texas
Video game companies established in 2009
2019 mergers and acquisitions
Video game companies disestablished in 2019
2019 disestablishments in Texas